English Electric: Full Power (sometimes abbreviated to EEFLP) is a compilation album by the English progressive rock band Big Big Train. It presents tracks from their seventh and eighth studio albums, English Electric Part One and English Electric Part Two, along with four new pieces (which were additionally released on the EP Make Some Noise) as a self-contained double CD album. The album was issued in a book-style digipack, including a 96-page booklet.

EEFLP (along with the Make Some Noise EP) marks the final release of English Electric material, which began work as early as 2010, and was the last release of new material from the band until  the EP Wassail in 2015. There is a new edition of EEFLP with different cover under the name of English Electric in 2016.

Background
Each song on the album tells a different story, many of them centering around characters living and working in England, with reference to the country's industrial past and processes which have changed its landscape. Full lyrics as well as descriptions of the stories behind the songs are included in the 96-page booklet of EEFLP. Additionally, Greg Spawton and David Longdon discussed the meanings of the tracks on the two initially released "parts" of English Electric in blogs leading up to the releases of those albums.

Track listing

Personnel
Nick D'Virgilio –  drums, cajon, backing vocals
Dave Gregory – 6 and 12 string electric guitars, electric sitar, E-bow guitars, banjo, mellotron, marimba, the voice of the court usher in "Judas Unrepentant"
David Longdon –  lead and backing vocals, flute, acoustic and electric guitars, banjo, accordion, melodica, piano, keyboards, vibraphone, tambourine, dumbek, shaker, the birds and the bees, dog whistling, cutlery and glassware
Danny Manners – piano, keyboards, double bass
Andy Poole –  electric piano, acoustic guitar, backing vocals, baritone bee
Gregory Spawton –  bass guitar, 6 and 12 string acoustic and electric guitars, mandolin, keyboards, backing vocals

Guest musicians
 Lily Adams – backing vocals, soprano bee
 Violet Adams – backing vocals, soprano bee
 Robin Armstrong – backing vocals
 Rob Aubrey – bass pedals
 Geraldine Berreen – violin
 Sue Bowran – violin
 Dave Desmond – trombone
 Megan Fisher – harp
 Eleanor Gilchrist – violin
 Ben Godfrey – cornet
 Simon Godfrey – backing vocals
 Rachel Hall – violin
 Verity Joy – backing vocals
 Jan Jaap Langereis – recorders
 Sandra Olma – backing vocals
 Martin Orford – backing vocals
 Lord Cornelius Plum – backwards guitar
 Daniel Steinhardt – electric guitar
 John Storey – euphonium
 Andy Tillison – keyboards
 Abigail Trundle – cello
 Jon Truscott – tuba
 Teresa Whipple – viola

Arrangements and technical
 String arrangement on "A Boy in Darkness", "Leopards" by Louis Phillipe
 Brass arrangement on "Swan Hunter", "Summoned by Bells", "Hedgerow", "The Permanent Way", "East Coast Racer" and "Curator of Butterflies" by Dave Desmond
 String arrangement on "The First Rebreather", "Winchester from St Giles' Hill", "East Coast Racer" and "Curator of Butterflies" by Dave Gregory
 String arrangement on "Swan Hunter" and "The Permanent Way" by Rachel Hall
 Closing section of "Summoned by Bells" arranged by Danny Manners
 Mixing and mastering by Rob Aubrey at Aubitt Studios

References

Big Big Train albums
2013 compilation albums
Compilation albums by British artists
Progressive rock compilation albums